Sinsemilla is the third album by Jamaican reggae band Black Uhuru, released in 1980 on the Island Records subsidiary Mango. The album helped the band achieve a global fanbase.

Critical reception
Trouser Press wrote that the album "delivers a level of consistency only Bob Marley himself had achieved." The Miami New Times wrote that "by 1980's Sinsemilla, Black Uhuru was a paragon of politics, close harmonies, pumping grooves, and a social awareness as astute and incisive as Marley's." Spin deemed Sinsemilla a "classic reggae" album, writing that Sly and Robbie's "trademark synth-drum grooves drove the group's harmonies like a diddling steam turbine."

Track listing

Personnel
Black Uhuru
Michael Rose - lead vocals
Derrick "Duckie" Simpson - harmony vocals
Puma Jones - harmony vocals
with:
Robbie Shakespeare - bass, lead bass on "Vampire"
Sly Dunbar - drums, percussion, electronic drums
Ansel Collins - acoustic piano, organ
Jimmy Becker - harmonica
Radcliffe "Dougie" Bryan - lead guitar
Bertram "Ranchie" McLean - rhythm guitar
Uziah "Sticky" Thompson - percussion
Technical
Lister Hewan Lowe, Lowell "Sly" Dunbar, Robert "Robbie" Shakespeare - executive producer
Ernest Hookim, Colonel Maxie (Lancelot "Maxie" McKenzie) - recording engineer
Tony Wright - cover illustration

References

Black Uhuru albums
1980 albums
Mango Records albums
Albums produced by Sly and Robbie